The Cessna Citation Excel is an American midsize business jet built by Cessna.
Announced in October 1994, the Model 560XL first flew on February 29, 1996, certification was granted in April 1998, and over 1,000 have been delivered.

The , 20,200 lb (9,200 kg) MTOW jet is powered by two  PW545 turbofans, has the cruciform tail and unswept supercritical wing of the Citation V (560), and a slightly shortened Citation X stand-up cabin.

The XLS 2004 update had upgraded engines and a glass cockpit and the 2008 XLS+ had upgraded engines and a revised nose.
The Excel is part of the Citation family.

Development

With the success of Cessna's high-end Citation VII, the manufacturer saw a market for an aircraft with the Citation X's features but aimed at a more traditional market, where it would chiefly compete with twin-turboprop aircraft.

The project was announced at the annual NBAA convention in October, 1994, and the prototype aircraft took off on its first flight on February 29, 1996. Federal Aviation Administration certification was granted in April 1998, by which time Cessna had over 200 orders for the aircraft. Its unit cost in 1999 was US$8.7M. By the time the 100th Excel was delivered in August 2000, an aircraft was coming off the Wichita production line every three days. A total of 308 were built before production switched to the Citation XLS.

The Citation XLS was the first "makeover" that the Excel received, with deliveries beginning in 2004. Besides a glass cockpit based on the Honeywell Primus 1000 EFIS avionics suite, the XLS featured the upgraded PW545B engines with increased performance. It was produced in 330 units.
By 2018, ten year old XLS models were trading near $4 million.

The Citation XLS+, or simply "Plus" configuration was another upgraded version of the aircraft which began delivery in 2008, with the inclusion of FADEC engine controls, improved PW545C engines, and a completely revised nose design similar to that found on the Citation Sovereign and Citation X. The Citation XLS+  features Collins Pro Line 21 Avionics and a four screen LCD EFIS display as opposed to the three tube (CRT) Honeywell display in the XL and the three screen LCD Primus 1000 in the XLS.
In 2022, its equipped price was $15.5M.

Design

The Excel has the roomiest cabin in its class of light corporate jets and can seat up to 10 passengers (in high-density configuration; typically the number is six to eight in a corporate configuration), while being flown by a crew of two.

To power the aircraft, Cessna chose the Pratt & Whitney Canada PW500 turbofan.

The original version had two cockpit configurations involving where the landing gear was on the panel. With the gear on the left hand side, the MFD was moved to the right slightly and both radios were moved to the right of the MFD next to each other. With the gear handle on the right side, the MFD remained centered with the radios on either side. The Excel uses Honeywell avionics and an optional Auxiliary power unit also powered by Honeywell.

Operators
The aircraft is operated by private individuals, companies, fractionals, charter operators and aircraft management companies. The Swiss Air Force is an operator. NetJets is also a major operator in the United States offering fractional ownership and charter flights.

The 560's ICAO aircraft type designator is C56X.

Accidents and incidents 

As of September 2021, the Citation Excel had been involved in eleven aviation accidents and incidents including six hull losses, with eleven fatalities stemming from two of the crashes. On 13 August 2014, a Citation 560XLS+ transporting Brazilian presidential candidate Eduardo Campos and his entourage in the lead up to elections in October crashed in the city of Santos, São Paulo, killing all 7 on board. This was the first fatal crash of a Citation Excel since entering service in 1996.

Specifications (Citation XLS+)

See also

References

External links

 Cessna Citation family home page
 Cessna's Excel performance and specifications page archived at archive.org

Citation Excel
1990s United States business aircraft
Twinjets
Low-wing aircraft
Excel
Aircraft first flown in 1996